Yevhen Volodymyrovych Halchuk ( born 5 March 1992) is a Ukrainian professional football goalkeeper who plays for Mariupol on loan from Inhulets Petrove.

Career
Halchuk is the member of different Ukrainian national youth football teams. Last time he was called up as member of the Ukraine national under-21 football team by coach Serhiy Kovalets in summer of 2013.

References

External links 
 
 

1992 births
Living people
Footballers from Kramatorsk
Ukrainian footballers
Association football goalkeepers
FC Shakhtar Donetsk players
FC Shakhtar-3 Donetsk players
FC Mariupol players
FC Inhulets Petrove players
Ukrainian Premier League players
Ukrainian First League players
Ukrainian Second League players
Ukraine youth international footballers
Ukraine under-21 international footballers